Albert Clifford Holliday (1897–1960) M. Arch, Dip. C.D., F.R.I.B.A., M.T.P., was a British architect and town planner who worked in several places across the British Empire, including Mandatory Palestine, Ceylon and Gibraltar, as well as in the UK.

Studies
Holliday gained his qualifications at the University of Liverpool where he studied under Sir Charles Reilly and Patrick Abercrombie. He later designed the University of Ceylon with Abercrombie.

Career

Mandate Palestine
Holliday was commissioned as civic adviser to the city of Jerusalem between 1922 and 1926 and town planning advisor to the mandatory government of Palestine between 1928 and 1934. He drew up a master plan for Jerusalem and the restoration of its Old City walls.

United Kingdom
In 1938, Holliday's design for a satellite town near Kincorth, outside Aberdeen, won an international prize.

In 1947, he was appointed Chief Architect for the first postwar British new town, Stevenage. He revised the plan for Stevenage, from the Ministry of Town and Country Planning's original plan, in 1949.

In 1952 Holliday became Professor of Town and Country Planning at the University of Manchester.

He was also involved in preparing the designs for Haslingden and Stoke-on-Trent.

Private life
Holliday had four sons.

Selected work

Buildings

Jerusalem
St John Ophthalmic Hospital's new wing, opened in 1930.
St Andrew's Church, aka the Scots Memorial Church (1930)
Old Town Hall (1930)
British and Foreign Bible Society Building (1926-28), 7 Yohanan MeGush Halav Street, now 8 Safra Square, currently housing municipality offices.

Elsewhere
University of Ceylon, together with Patrick Abercrombie.

Town plans
Colombo
Gibraltar
Stevenage New Town

In Palestine (1922-35)
Jaffa
Jerusalem
Lydda – C. Holliday in 1829, followed later by Otto Polchek
Netanya
Ramla
Tiberias

Gallery

See also
 Charles Robert Ashbee, first British-appointed town planner of Jerusalem (1919-1922)
 Patrick Geddes, designed the master plan for Tel Aviv in 1927
 Zoltan Harmat, Jewish architect who worked both for Holliday's Jerusalem office and privately
 Austin Harrison, British town planner and architect active in Mandatory Palestine
 Richard Kauffmann, Jewish-German town planner and architect active in Mandatory Palestine
 Ernest Tatham Richmond, British architect, Consulting Architect to the Haram ash-Sharif (1918–20)

References

1897 births
1960 deaths
20th-century English architects
Architects in Mandatory Palestine
Architects from Yorkshire